HMS Truculent was a British submarine of the third group of the T-class. She was built as P315 by Vickers Armstrong, Barrow, and launched on 12 September 1942. She sank nine enemy vessels.

The submarine was funded by donations from the town of Glossop in Derbyshire, whose population raised £175,000 in 1942-3 to fund warships.

Her bow struck a Swedish oil tanker outside the mouth of the Medway in January 1950. Held primarily responsible, Truculent began to sink – 64 men were lost as she was ferrying workers as well as carrying her crew – and her wreck was towed to the destined nearby dockyard then sold for scrap.

Regional navigation rules thereafter mandated a Truculent Light – a panoramic white light on the bow of submarines moving under their own power.

Wartime service
Truculent spent much of her World War II wartime service in the Pacific Far East, save for early 1943, operating on the European shelf. Here, in the Norwegian Sea she sank the German submarine U-308 with all hands on its first patrol.

She took part in Operation Source, towing the X-class midget submarine X-6 to Norway to attack the heavy Kriegsmarine warships ,  and Lützow.

On her transfer to the Pacific, she sank the Japanese army cargo ship Yasushima Maru; the small vessel Mantai; the merchant cargo ship, turned hell ship, Harukiku Maru with 180 of 720 POWs killed and five Japanese sailing vessels.

She survived the war and returned to the United Kingdom to continue in service with the Royal Navy.

Sinking
On 12 January 1950, Truculent was returning to Sheerness, having completed trials after a refit at Chatham. In addition to her peacetime complement, she was carrying 18 dockyard workers. She was delving into the Thames Estuary at night. At 19:00, a ship showing three lights appeared ahead. It was decided it must be stationary, and because Truculent could not pass to the starboard side without running aground, the order was given to turn to port. At once, the situation became clear; the Swedish oil tanker Divinaon passage from Purfleet and bound for Ipswichcame out of the darkness. The extra light indicated that she was carrying a very combustible cargo. The two collided, the Divina's bow striking Truculent by the starboard bow hydroplane, and remained locked together for a few seconds before the submarine sank.

Fifty-seven of her crew were swept away in the current from a later-deemed premature escape – 15 survivors were picked up by a boat from the Divina and five by the Dutch ship Almdijk. Most of the crew survived the collision and escaped, but died in the freezing cold mid-winter conditions on the mud islands that litter the estuary.

Sixty-four men died. Truculent was salvaged on 14 March and beached at Cheney Spit. The wreck was moved inshore the next day, where 10 bodies were recovered. She was refloated on 23 March and towed into Sheerness Dockyard. An inquiry attributed 75% of the blame to Truculent and 25% to Divina.

Truculent was then sold to be broken up for scrap on 8 May 1950.

Her loss led Peter de Neumann of the Port of London Authority to develop plans for a port control system, and the later introduction of the 'Truculent light', an extra steaming all-round white light on the bow, on British submarines, to ensure they remained highly visible to other ships.

Commemoration in coinciding film
On 21 February 1950, the film Morning Departure was released. The story, of a British submarine on a training cruise that sinks after encountering a loose mine, is told from the perspective of the small group of survivors trapped under the sea. Filming finished shortly before HMS Truculent sank, and the film was almost withdrawn. The decision was made to release the film as planned, and to add the following message that appears in the opening credits:
This film was completed before the tragic loss of HMS Truculent, and
earnest consideration has been given as to the desirability of presenting
it so soon after this grievous disaster.
The Producers have decided to offer the film in the spirit in which it was made,
as a tribute to the officers and men of H.M. Submarines, and to the Royal Navy of which they form a part.

See also

HMS Thetis (N25)
List of United Kingdom disasters by death toll

References

Publications

External links

 

British T-class submarines of the Royal Navy
Ships built in Barrow-in-Furness
1942 ships
World War II submarines of the United Kingdom
Cold War submarines of the United Kingdom
Maritime incidents in 1950
British submarine accidents
Shipwrecks in the North Sea
Submarines sunk in collisions
Maritime disasters in Kent
Thames Estuary